Daniel "Danny" Grant (born 23 December 1999) is an Irish footballer who plays as a forward in the EFL Championship for Huddersfield Town, but as of 1 September 2022, is on loan at EFL League Two side Harrogate Town.

Club career
Grant was named in the PFAI Team of the Year in 2020 and was also named PFAI Young Player of the Year

On 19 December 2020, Grant signed a long-term contract with Huddersfield Town in the Championship. The deal ran until the summer of 2023, with the club having the option on a further year’s extension. In January 2021, shortly after arriving at the club, Grant tore his right hamstring and having worked his way back to fitness, almost immediately tore the hamstring in his other leg, keeping him out of action for the entirety of 2021.

On 1 September 2022, Grant joined EFL League Two side Harrogate Town on a season-long loan deal.

International career
Grant is an international player representing the Republic of Ireland national under-21 football team.

Career statistics

Honours

Club 
Bohemians U19
 League of Ireland U19 Division: 2017, 2018

Individual
 PFAI Young Player of the Year: 2020
 PFAI Team of the Year: 2020
 League of Ireland Player of the Month: August 2020

References

1999 births
Living people
Huddersfield Town A.F.C. players
Harrogate Town A.F.C. players
Republic of Ireland association footballers
Association football midfielders
Cherry Orchard F.C. players
Crumlin United F.C. players
Bohemian F.C. players
League of Ireland players
Republic of Ireland youth international footballers